Anca Dana Paliu Dragu (born 3 May 1972) is a Romanian economist and politician. She was the former Minister of Public Finance and was the President of the Senate of Romania from 21 December 2020 until 23 November 2021. She is the first woman in the history of the Senate to hold this position.

Dragu graduated from the Bucharest Academy of Economic Studies in 1996. From 1999 to 2000 she studied at Georgetown University. She obtained an MA degree in public administration from the National University of Political Studies and Public Administration in 2007 and a PhD in economics from the Bucharest Academy of Economic Studies in 2010.

See also
 List of Ministers of Finance of Romania

References

|-

1972 births
Living people
21st-century Romanian economists
21st-century Romanian women politicians
21st-century Romanian politicians
Presidents of the Senate of Romania
Romanian Ministers of Finance
Members of the Senate of Romania
Bucharest Academy of Economic Studies alumni
National University of Political Studies and Public Administration alumni
Freedom, Unity and Solidarity Party politicians
Women legislative speakers